Shenzhoulu station, is a station of Line 21 on the Guangzhou Metro.  It started operations on 20 December 2019.

The station has an underground island platform. Platform 1 is for trains heading to Zengcheng Square, whilst platform 2 is for trains heading to Yuancun.

Exits
There are 2 exits, lettered A and B. Exit B is accessible. Both exits are located on Science Avenue.

Gallery

Operational accident 
At around 13:00 on July 30, 2021, short-term heavy rainfall occurred in Guangzhou. The ground retaining wall of a reserved exit under construction collapsed, causing ground water to flow into the station through the exit. The subway company immediately terminated the service between Huangcun station and Suyuan station. All passengers stranded in the station were evacuated without causing casualties. After that, the water inlet was also blocked. During the period, the subway company also arranged for shuttle buses to walk thought the two stations. At 19:15, the subway company announced that the blocked section open for service, but the station still suspends operations, and the train passes through the station without stopping. At 20:00 that day, the station resumed operations. The accident attracted attention due to the serious flooding of Zhengzhou Metro Line 5 that occurred before. After the investigation, it was confirmed that a retaining wall that did not meet the quality requirements was built illegally for the construction site near the exit. The water retaining wall collapsed during the heavy rain, causing water into the exit. Relevant management personnel were subject to administrative punishment or disciplinary action within the Party.

References

Railway stations in China opened in 2019
Guangzhou Metro stations in Huangpu District